The Taipei International Convention Center (TICC) is a convention center in Xinyi District, Taipei, Taiwan. The convention center is an integral part of the Taipei World Trade Center. Except for renting for conferences and exhibitions, the venue is also used for holding concerts and launch parties.

History
The convention center was opened in 1989.

Architecture
TICC consists of 6 floors with a total area of 14,727 m2. The buildings stands at a height of 49 meters. It consists of a multipurpose plenary hall, meeting rooms of various sizes and a banquet hall.

Events
 14th National Congress of the Kuomintang
 15th National Congress of the Kuomintang
 2nd Cross-Strait CEO Summit

Transportation
The convention center is accessible from Taipei 101–World Trade Center Station of the Taipei Metro.

See also
 List of tourist attractions in Taiwan
 Taipei World Trade Center

References

External links

 

1989 establishments in Taiwan
Convention centers in Taipei
Event venues established in 1989
Tourist attractions in Taipei
Xinyi Special District